Theegarten-Pactec is a German manufacturer in the packaging technology sector. The company develops and produces packaging machines and complete packaging systems for bite-sized confectionery products and other foodstuffs, such as bouillon cubes, as well as for non-food items, e.g. dishwasher detergent. The packaging machines are developed and manufactured exclusively in Germany and are distributed worldwide.

References 

 packagingeurope, 10/01/2014, Double Anniversary for Theegarten-Pactec
 fair INTERPACK 2014; Düsseldorf, Germany 

Manufacturing companies based in Dresden